The 2013–14 Saltillo Rancho Seco season was the first international season of the Saltillo Rancho Seco professional indoor soccer club. The Saltillo Rancho Seco, a Central Division team in the Professional Arena Soccer League, played their home games at the newly constructed Deportivo Rancho-Seco Saltillo in Saltillo, the capital of the northern Mexican state of Coahuila. While construction was underway, the team played its first home game on the campus of the Autonomous University of Coahuila.

The team was led by owner/general manager Marco Antonio Davila De Leon and head coach Elizandro Campos with assistant coach Jesus Monroy.

Season summary
The team struggled from the start with a loss to the Monterrey Flash then splitting their next eight games, losing to teams with winning records and beating teams with losing records. Saltillo performed only slightly better at home (3–4) than they did on the road (2–3). 2014 saw Saltillo winning only one game (the hapless Texas Strikers), facing steadily declining attendance at home, and earning a 6–10 record on the season. Only the top three teams in the Central Division qualified for the post-season and Saltillo was mathematically eliminated in late January.

Unlike the 17 US-based PASL teams, Saltillo Rancho Seco and the other two Mexico-based franchises did not participate in the 2013–14 United States Open Cup for Arena Soccer.

History
Saltillo is the third team based in Mexico to join the PASL. For the past three seasons, Saltillo has been a successful member of the Liga Mexicana de Futbol Rápido Profesional (LMFR) and plans to remain a member of both leagues.

Schedule

Regular season

♥ Rescheduled from February 2 at league request.

References

External links
Saltillo Rancho Seco at Facebook
Saltillo Rancho Seco at El Diario de Coahuila

Saltillo Ranco Seco
Saltillo Rancho Seco
Saltillo Rancho Seco 2013
Saltillo Rancho Seco 2013
Saltillo Rancho Seco 2013